A leadership election was held in the Liberal Democratic Party of Japan on 20 September 2006 after the incumbent party leader and Prime Minister Junichiro Koizumi announced his intention to resign, a year after he led the party to victory in a snap election. Shinzō Abe won the election, (only to resign a year later triggering another leadership election). His chief competitors for the position were Sadakazu Tanigaki and Taro Aso. Yasuo Fukuda was a leading early contender, but ultimately chose not to run. Former Prime Minister Yoshirō Mori, to whose faction both Abe and Fukuda belonged, stated that the faction strongly leant toward Abe. Abe was subsequently elected Prime Minister with 339 of 475 votes in the Diet's lower house and a majority in the upper house.

Results

References

2006 elections in Japan
Political party leadership elections in Japan
Liberal Democratic Party (Japan)
Shinzo Abe
Indirect elections
Liberal Democratic Party (Japan) leadership election